The Black Flame may refer to:

 The Black Flame (album), a 2006 album by Swedish heavy metal band Wolf
 The Black Flame (magazine), a bi-annual publication of the Church of Satan
 The Black Flame (novel), a 1948 science fiction novel by Stanley G. Weinbaum
 B.P.R.D.: The Black Flame, a 2005 series of comics

See also 
 Black Flame (disambiguation)